Intensities in 10 Cities is the second live album by the American guitarist Ted Nugent, released in 1981 and consisting of ten songs recorded during the last ten dates of Nugent's 1980 tour. Nugent played two or three new songs every night on the tour and told audiences he was recording them for possible inclusion in a new live album featuring all previously unreleased songs. None of the songs had appeared on any previous Ted Nugent album. Nugent explained at the time that about twenty previously unreleased songs were played at the beginning of the tour, and at the end the best ten were recorded live rather than in the studio later, because they were well-honed from months of performances and had the extra spark of a live setting. It was Ted Nugent's final album for Epic Records and the last album to feature drummer Cliff Davies.

Reception

The album was ranked at number 9 on Guitar Worlds list of the "Top 10 Live Albums". Australian band TISM parodied the title on their 1991 video release Incontinent in Ten Continents.

The ten cities/venues were:
Detroit – Cobo Arena
Buffalo – Buffalo Memorial Auditorium
Richfield – Richfield Coliseum
Toronto – Maple Leaf Gardens
Montreal – Montreal Forum
Boston – Boston Garden
New Haven – New Haven Coliseum
Pittsburgh – Civic Arena
Rochester – Rochester Community War Memorial
Providence – Providence Civic Center

Two tracks from the album (as well as others from various Nugent live releases) appeared on his 2010 release Setlist, part of Legacy Recordings' series of live artist-specific compilations from its catalog. "The Flying Lip Lock" is listed as from the New Haven Coliseum, and "I Take No Prisoners" from the Providence Civic Center. This is the first time specific tracks have been identified as from specific venues.

Controversy 
The song "Jailbait" sparked backlash as the lyrics discuss wanting to have sex with a 13-year-old which would constitute statutory rape ("Well, I don't care if you're just thirteen, you look too good to be true"), and later sharing her when the police show up to arrest the perpetrator ("Wait a minute, officer, don't put those handcuffs on me / Put them on her and I'll share her with you"). These lyrics have retrospectively been pointed out be paradox given Nugent's frequent political campaigning with and for "family values"-candidates.

Track listing 
All songs written and arranged by Ted Nugent, except "Land of a Thousand Dances", written by Chris Kenner.
Side one
"Put Up or Shut Up" – 3:21
"Spontaneous Combustion" – 3:53
"My Love Is Like a Tire Iron" – 5:48
"Jailbait" – 5:15
"I Am a Predator" – 3:16

Side two
"Heads Will Roll" – 4:07
"The Flying Lip Lock" – 4:07
"Land of a Thousand Dances" – 4:39
"The TNT Overture" – 4:31
"I Take No Prisoners" – 3:30

Personnel 
Band members
 Ted Nugent – lead vocals, lead guitar
 Charlie Huhn – lead and backing vocals, rhythm guitar
 Dave Kiswiney – bass, backing vocals
 Cliff Davies – drums, percussion, backing vocals, producer

Production
 Ric Browde – producer
 Lew Futterman – executive producer
 David McCullough – assistant producer, live sound engineer
 Al Hurschman, Dee Hurschman, Greg Klinginsmith, Tim Geelan, Mason Harlow – engineers
 Ray Janos – mastering

Charts

Album

Singles

References 

Ted Nugent albums
1981 live albums
Epic Records live albums